Giulio Tonti (9 December 1844 – 11 December 1918) was an Italian Cardinal of the Roman Catholic Church who served as Prefect of the Sacred Congregation of Religious from 1917 until his death, and was elevated to the cardinalate in 1915.

Biography
Giulio Tonti was born in Rome, and received the Sacrament of Confirmation on 17 August 1856. He studied at the Pontifical Roman Seminary, from where he obtained his doctorates in philosophy, in theology, and in canon and civil law.

Tonti was ordained to the priesthood on 21 December 1867, and then served as professor of theology and vice-rector of the Pontifical Urbanian Athenaeum De Propaganda Fide until 1879. He became an official of the Sacred Congregation of Extraordinary Ecclesiastical Affairs in the Roman Curia before serving as auditor of the nunciature to France (1879–1882) and to Portugal (1882–1892). He was raised to the honorary rank of Privy Chamberlain of His Holiness as well.

On 11 July 1892, Tonti was appointed Apostolic Delegate to Santo Domingo, Haiti, and Venezuela and Titular Archbishop of Samos by Pope Leo XIII. He received his episcopal consecration on the following 25 July from Cardinal Vincenzo Vannutelli, with Bishops Michele dei Baroni Zezza Zaponetta and Augusto Berlucca serving as co-consecrators. He was later named Apostolic Administrator of Port-au-Prince and of Les Gonaïves on 24 February 1893, and Titular Archbishop of Sardes on the following 15 July.

Archbishop Tonti rose to become Archbishop of Port-au-Prince, whilst retaining the administration of the Diocese of Les Gonaïves, on 1 October 1894. He was then appointed Nuncio to Brazil and Titular Archbishop of Ancyra on 23 August 1902, and Nuncio to Portugal on 4 October 1906. On 25 October  1910, Tonti resigned his diplomatic post in Portugal as a result of the country's revolution, and returned to Rome.

Pope Benedict XV created him Cardinal-Priest of Ss. Silvestro e Martino ai Monti in the consistory of 6 December 1915. He was later named Prefect of the Sacred Congregation of Religious on 13 February 1917, also becoming a member of the Council for the Administration of the Wealth of the Apostolic See on 21 May of that same year.

Tonti died in his native Rome, at two days after his 74th birthday. He is buried in the tomb of the chapter of St. Peter's Basilica at the Campo Verano cemetery in Rome.

External links
Catholic-Hierarchy
Cardinals of the Holy Roman Church

1844 births
1918 deaths
Clergy from Rome
20th-century Italian cardinals
19th-century Italian Roman Catholic archbishops
20th-century Italian Roman Catholic archbishops
Members of the Congregation for Institutes of Consecrated Life and Societies of Apostolic Life
Pontifical Urban University alumni
Pontifical Roman Seminary alumni
Apostolic Nuncios to Brazil
Apostolic Nuncios to Portugal
Apostolic Nuncios to Haiti
Apostolic Nuncios to the Dominican Republic
Apostolic Nuncios to Venezuela
Roman Catholic archbishops of Port-au-Prince